is a Japanese professional footballer who plays as a midfielder for Colorado Rapids 2.

Career
Yosuke Hanya joined FC Tokyo in 2016. On July 31, he debuted in J3 League (vs Gainare Tottori). He then left to study at University of Massachusetts Amherst. In February 2022, Hanya joined Colorado Rapids 2 ahead of their first season in MLS Next Pro.

References

External links

1999 births
Living people
Association football people from Tokyo
Japanese footballers
J3 League players
FC Tokyo players
FC Tokyo U-23 players
Association football midfielders
Japanese expatriate footballers
Expatriate soccer players in the United States
Japanese expatriate sportspeople in the United States
UMass Minutemen soccer players
Colorado Rapids 2 players
MLS Next Pro players